Raoof Haghighi is an Iranian-born British artist, known for his portraiture and realism.

He was born in 1976 in Shiraz, Iran. His father was an artist and it was in Iran where he started to learn painting; he is a self taught artist. Since 1995, he has had many group and solo art exhibitions internationally, including in Iran, the United Kingdom, United States, Czech Republic, Spain, and Ireland.

In April 2023, Raoof will showcase his ‘surreal and hyperrealistic’ portraits and drawings at a London exhibit which he is dedicating to ‘all the brave women’ in Iran fighting for their freedom.

Awards 
 2011, 2015, 2017 – BP Portrait Award, National Portrait Gallery, London, England
2017 – Winner of the Gold Memorial Bowl award for best miniature work in the exhibition at the Royal Society of Miniature Painters, Sculptors and Gravers, London, England
 2016 – Overall winner of Jackson's competition 'Drawn in competition', Jackson Art Supplies, London, England
 2014 – Sky Arts Portrait Artist of the Year 2014 London Heat winner
 2011 – Overall winner – Artist of the Year 2011 – Artists & Illustrators magazine

Exhibitions 
 Prague City Gallery – The Stone Bell House The Reunion of Poetry and Philosophy 3 March – 4 April 2018
 BP Portrait Award 2017 – The National Portrait Gallery, London – 22 June – 24 September 2017
 Royal Society of Miniature Painters. 20 September – 1 October 2017 at Mall Galleries, London.
BP Portrait Award 2015 – June–September 2015 – National Portrait Gallery, London
 BP Portrait Award 2011 National Portrait Gallery, London – Wolverhampton Art Gallery

References 

Living people
Iranian painters
1976 births
People from Shiraz
British portrait artists
British people of Iranian descent
Surrealist artists
Portrait artists